Sterling Sharp (born May 30, 1995) is an American professional baseball pitcher in the Boston Red Sox organization. He has previously played in Major League Baseball (MLB) for the Miami Marlins.

Career

High school and college
Sharp was originally selected by the Atlanta Braves in the 30th round of the 2013 MLB draft out of North Farmington High School in Farmington Hills, Michigan. He elected not to sign, instead honoring a commitment to Eastern Michigan University. Three years later, Sharp was drafted by the Washington Nationals in the 22nd round of the 2016 MLB draft and elected to sign. At the time he was drafted by the Nationals, Sharp was playing for the Drury University Panthers after transferring from Eastern Michigan. He was only the second player from Drury to be drafted by an MLB team at the time of his signing.

Washington Nationals
Sharp made his professional debut with the GCL Nationals, and after posting a 3–0 record with a 3.24 earned run average (ERA) and 1.27 walks plus hits per inning pitched (WHIP), was promoted to the Auburn Doubledays, where he made one start to end the season. He began 2017 with the Hagerstown Suns and was later promoted to the Potomac Nationals. In 24 total games (22 starts) between both teams, he pitched to a 6–11 record, a 3.97 ERA and a 1.33 WHIP in  combined innings. He was also called upon by the major-league club toward the end of the year to pitch to hitters rehabbing from injury or preparing for the 2017 National League Division Series.

In 2018, Sharp returned to the Potomac Nationals and was named a Carolina League All-Star. He was promoted to the Double-A Harrisburg Senators for the first time in June 2018. He also made the MLB Pipeline list of top Nationals prospects, being ranked as the organization's 14th-best prospect the following month, the Nationals' fastest riser on the list. After the 2018 season, Baseball America ranked Sharp as the Nationals' eighth-best prospect. In 2019, Sharp battled injury issues, missing almost three months of the regular season with an oblique strain. Making up for lost time, he pitched for the Surprise Saguaros in the Arizona Fall League, earning pitcher-of-the-week honors for the week of October 7, 2019.

Miami Marlins
On December 12, 2019, Sharp was selected third overall in the 2019 Rule 5 draft by the Miami Marlins. He did not play in the minor leagues during 2020, as the minor-league season was cancelled. On August 5, 2020, Sharp made his MLB debut. He was designated for assignment on August 24. In four major-league appearances, Sharp pitched to a 10.13 ERA, having allowed 6 earned runs over  innings of relief while striking out three batters.

Washington Nationals (second stint)
On August 27, 2020, Sharp was returned to the Nationals organization by the Marlins. The Nationals added him to their 60-man player pool at their alternate training site in Fredericksburg, Virginia. During 2021, Sharp split time between Double-A Harrisburg and the Triple-A Rochester Red Wings; in 19 total appearances (17 starts), he compiled a 4–6 record with 4.43 ERA while striking out 59 batters in  innings. Sharp again pitched for Rochester in 2022, posting a 2–5 record in 18 appearances (13 starts) with 59 strikeouts in  innings and a 6.62 ERA. On August 5, 2022, Sharp was released by the Nationals.

Boston Red Sox
On August 9, 2022, Sharp signed a minor-league contract with the Boston Red Sox. He elected free agency on November 10, 2022.

On January 10, 2023, Sharp re-signed with the Red Sox organization on a new minor league contract.

Pitching style
Sharp pitches right-handed. In 2017, after studying footage of Blake Treinen, Zach Britton, and others, he developed a sinker that had become his primary pitch by the 2018 season, largely supplanting his low-90s fastball in his arsenal. In addition to his sinker and straight fastball, Sharp also throws an above-average changeup and a slider.

In the media, Sharp has drawn some attention for the similarity of his name to retired National Football League wide receiver Sterling Sharpe.

See also
Rule 5 draft results

References

External links

Drury Panthers bio

1995 births
Living people
African-American baseball players
Auburn Doubledays players
Baseball players from Michigan
Drury Panthers baseball players
Eastern Michigan Eagles baseball players
Gulf Coast Nationals players
Hagerstown Suns players
Harrisburg Senators players
Major League Baseball pitchers
Miami Marlins players
People from Farmington Hills, Michigan
Potomac Nationals players
Rochester Red Wings players
Surprise Saguaros players
21st-century African-American sportspeople
Madison Mallards players